Sergey Korepanov may refer to:

 Sergey Korepanov (racewalker) (born 1964), Kazakhstani race walker
 Sergey Korepanov (politician) (1948–2022), Russian politician